The Rudderow-class destroyer escorts were destroyer escorts launched in the United States in 1943 to 1945.  Of this class, 22 were completed as destroyer escorts, and 50 were completed as s and were re-classified as high speed transport APDs. One ship was converted to an APD after completion.  They served in World War II as convoy escorts and anti-submarine warfare ships.

History
The ships had General Electric steam turbo-electric drive engines. The ships were built at various shipyards in the United States, including the Philadelphia Navy Yard and Defoe Shipbuilding Company. The main differences were the Rudderows had two  enclosed guns and two twin-40 mm mounts, instead of the three  open guns and one twin-40 mm or one quad  mount of the Buckleys. Another major difference is the style of the configuration of the area of the bridge and pilothouse which is low and enclosed compared to the Buckley Class which is tall and enclosed. The Rudderow Class is similar to the John C. Butler Class in this case and a distinguishing feature between these two class DEs is the size and number of the portholes in the pilothouse. The Rudderow class has seven 16-inch portholes and the John C. Butler Class has nine 12-inch portholes, with both classes having three portholes facing the bow. The class was also known as the TEV type from their Turbo-Electric drive and 5-inch (V) guns.

The final 180 of the class were canceled near the end of the war. After World War II, some of the surviving units of this class were transferred to Taiwan, South Korea, Chile, Colombia, Mexico, and other countries. The rest were retained by the US Navy's reserve fleet until they were decommissioned.

Ships in Class

See also
 List of destroyer escorts of the United States Navy
 List of frigates of the United States Navy subset of above with hull numbers DE/FF 1037 and higher plus all DEG/FFGs because of the United States Navy 1975 ship reclassification
 List of frigates

References

External links

 Destroyer History.org - Rudderow-class destroyer escort
 http://www.desausa.org/ Destroyer Escort Sailors Association (DESA).